Gholam Reza Ghassab (born 21 March 1956) is an Iranian wrestler. He competed in the men's Greco-Roman 62 kg at the 1976 Summer Olympics.

References

External links
 

1956 births
Living people
Iranian male sport wrestlers
Olympic wrestlers of Iran
Wrestlers at the 1976 Summer Olympics
Place of birth missing (living people)